Calpan Municipality is a municipality in Puebla in south-eastern Mexico.

History
Calpan was a Nahuatl-speaking community prior to the Spanish incursion.  During the era of New Spain it was Corregidor of Atrisco.

References

Municipalities of Puebla